Events from the year 1798 in art.

Events
 English painter Robert Smirke begins to produce The Seven Ages of Man series for the Boydell Shakespeare Gallery.

Works

 William Beechey
 George III and the Prince of Wales reviewing troops
 Thomas Hope
 François Gérard – Cupid and Psyche
 Anne-Louis Girodet de Roussy-Trioson – Jean-Baptiste Belley
 Francisco Goya
Gaspar Melchor de Jovellanos (approximate date)
 Witches' Sabbath
 Antoine-Jean Gros – Le pont d'Arcole
 Thomas Lawrence – Caroline, Princess of Wales
 John Opie – Portrait of Amelia Opie
 Thomas Whitcombe – The Battle of Camperdown, 11 October 1797

Births
 January 8 – John Graham Lough, English sculptor known for his funerary monuments and a variety of portrait sculpture (died 1876)
 January 9 – Philippe Joseph Henri Lemaire, French sculptor (died 1880)
 February 17 – Josef Matěj Navrátil, Czech painter of paintings, murals and frescos (died 1865)
 March – David Hay, Scottish-born interior decorator (died 1866)
 March 12 – Elizabeth Goodridge, American painter specializing in miniatures (died 1882)
 April 26 – Eugène Delacroix, French Romantic painter (died 1863)
 June 22 – Ditlev Blunck, Danish painter (died 1854)
 July 16 – Abbondio Sangiorgio, Italian sculptor (died 1879)
 July 29 – Carl Blechen, German painter specializing in fantastic landscapes with demons and grotesque figures (died 1840)
 September 28 – Charles-Philippe Larivière, French academic painter and lithographer (died 1876)
 October 13 – Herman Wilhelm Bissen, Danish sculptor (died 1868)
 October 24 – Massimo d'Azeglio, Italian statesman, novelist and painter (died 1866)
 November 29 – Alexander Brullov, Russian painter, teacher and architect (died 1877)
 December 8 – Antoine Laurent Dantan, French academic sculptor (died 1878)
 date unknown
 John Cart Burgess, English watercolour painter of flowers and landscapes (died 1863)
 Jean Henri De Coene, Belgian painter of genre and historical subjects (died 1866)
 Konstantin Danil, Serbian painter (died 1873)
 William Egley, English miniature painter (died 1870)
 James Eights, American scientist and watercolour painter (died 1882)
 Thomas Foster, Irish portrait painter (died 1826)
 James Duffield Harding, English landscape painter (died 1863)
 Demeter Laccataris, Austro-Hungarian portrait painter of Greek origin (died 1864)
 Henry O'Neill, Irish illustrator and archaeologist (died 1880)
 Robert Seymour, English illustrator (suicide 1836)
 Rafael Stupin, Russian painter (died 1860s)
 Henry Bryan Ziegler, British landscape and portrait painter (died 1874)

Deaths
 January 4 – Gavin Hamilton, Scottish neoclassical history painter (born 1723)
 January 25 – Christopher Unterberger, Italian painter of the early-Neoclassical period (born 1732)
 February 9 – Antoine de Favray, French-born portrait painter (born 1706)
 May 25 – Asmus Jacob Carstens, Danish-German (born 1754)
 May 27 – Franciszek Pinck, Polish sculptor and stucco artist (born 1733)
 August 28 – Charles Catton, English painter (born 1728)
 October 30 – Anton Hickel, Bohemian painter (born 1745)
 December 8 – Richard Newton, English caricaturist, of typhus (born 1777)
 date unknown
 Giuseppe Angeli, Venetian painter of the late-baroque (born 1709)
 Christopher Hewetson, Irish sculptor (born c. 1737)
 Innocenzo Spinazzi, sculptor (born 1726)
 Mikhail Shibanov, Russian painter (b. unknown)
 Vincenzio Vangelisti, Italian engraver (born 1740)

References

 
Years of the 18th century in art
1790s in art